New Mexico has the fifth lowest per capita income in the United States of America, at $17,261 (2000).  Its personal per capita income is $25,541 (2003).

New Mexico counties ranked by per capita income 

Note: Data is from the 2010 United States Census Data and the 2006-2010 American Community Survey 5-Year Estimates.

References

New Mexico
Economy of New Mexico
Income